The 2011 Indiana State Sycamores football team represented Indiana State University as a member of the Missouri Valley Football Conference (MVFC) during the 2011 NCAA Division I FCS football season. Led by fourth-year head coach Trent Miles, the Sycamores compiled an overall record of 6–5 with a mark of 4–4 in conference play, tying for fourth place in the MVFC. Indiana State played home games at Memorial Stadium in Terre Haute, Indiana.

Schedule

References

Indiana State
Indiana State Sycamores football seasons
Indiana State Sycamores football